Felix Weber (born 18 January 1995) is a German professional footballer who plays as a centre-back for  club SpVgg Bayreuth.

Honours
SpVgg Bayreuth
 Regionalliga Bayern: 2021–22

References

1995 births
Living people
German footballers
Germany youth international footballers
Association football defenders
TSV 1860 Munich II players
TSV 1860 Munich players
Rot-Weiss Essen players
SpVgg Bayreuth players
2. Bundesliga players
Regionalliga players
3. Liga players
People from Weilheim-Schongau
Footballers from Bavaria